Dolby Atmos is a surround sound technology developed by Dolby Laboratories. It expands on existing surround sound systems by adding height channels, allowing sounds to be interpreted as three-dimensional objects with neither horizontal nor vertical limitation. Following the release of Atmos for the cinema market, a variety of consumer technologies has been released under the Atmos brand, using in-ceiling and up-firing speakers.

History

The first Dolby Atmos installation was in the El Capitan Theater in Los Angeles, for the premiere of Brave in June 2012. Throughout 2012, it saw a limited release of about 25 installations worldwide, with an increase to 300 locations in 2013. As of October 2022, there were over 10,000 Dolby Atmos enabled cinema screens, installed, or committed to. Dolby Atmos has also been adapted to a home theater format and is the audio component of Dolby Cinema. Most electronic devices since 2016, as well as smartphones after 2017, have been enabled for Dolby Atmos recording and mixing. The full set of technical specifications for Dolby Digital Plus with Dolby Atmos are standardized and published in ETSI TS 103 420.

In 2016 Power was the first television show natively mixed and broadcast in Atmos for its third season, though in the same year, Game of Thrones up-mixed their previous 5.1 presentations for the Blu-ray reissue. R.E.M.'s 1992 album Automatic for the People was the first major music release with its 25th anniversary reissue in 2017.

Technology

Dolby Atmos technology allows up to 128 audio tracks plus associated spatial audio description metadata (location or pan automation data, data about the sound's movement, type, intensity, speed and volume) to be distributed to theaters for optimal, dynamic rendering to loudspeakers based on the theater capabilities. Each audio track can be assigned to an audio channel, the conventional format for distribution, or to an audio "object." Dolby Atmos in theaters has a 9.1 (commonly referred to as 7.1.2) channel-based "bed" channels for ambience stems or center dialogue, leaving 118 tracks for objects. Atmos for home in film, TV and music uses a technique called "spatial coding" to reduce the audio to up to a maximum of 16 concurrent "elements" or audio location clusters, that adapt to the content dynamically. In Atmos games ISF (Intermediate Spatial format) is used, that supports 32 total active objects (for 7.1.4 bed 20 additional dynamic objects can be active). Each object specifies its apparent source location in the theater, as a set of three-dimensional rectangular coordinates relative to the defined audio channel locations and theater boundaries.

Dolby Atmos home theaters can be built upon conventional 5.1 and 7.1 layouts. For Dolby Atmos, the nomenclature differs slightly by an additional number at the end, that represents the amount of overhead or Dolby Atmos enabled speakers: a 7.1.4 Dolby Atmos system is a conventional 7.1 layout with four overhead or Dolby Atmos enabled speakers. The simplest Dolby Atmos setup is 3.1.2, the most professional one is 24.1.10.

Dolby Atmos content is authored using compatible digital audio workstation software (Dolby supplies a plug-in for Pro Tools) or a suitably equipped large format audio mixing console such as AMS Neve's DFC or Harrison's MPC5.

The Dolby Atmos sound system consists of a compatible speaker system, a TV or an AV media player and an AV receiver (or preprocessor), that has a Dolby Atmos object audio renderer. During playback, each theater's Dolby Atmos system renders the audio objects in real time based on the known locations of the loudspeakers present in the target theater, such that each audio object is heard as originating from its designated set of coordinates. By way of contrast, conventional multichannel technology essentially burns all the source audio tracks into a fixed number of channels during post-production. This has conventionally forced the re-recording mixer to make assumptions about the playback environment that may not apply very well to a particular theater. The addition of audio objects allows the mixer to be more creative, to bring more sounds off the screen, and be confident of the results.

The first-generation cinema hardware, the "Dolby Atmos Cinema Processor," supports up to 128 discrete audio tracks and up to 64 unique speaker feeds.
The technology was initially created for commercial cinema applications, and was later adapted to home cinema. In addition to playing back a standard 5.1 or 7.1 mix using loudspeakers grouped into arrays, the Dolby Atmos system can also give each loudspeaker its own unique feed based on its exact location, thereby enabling many new front, surround, and even ceiling-mounted height channels for the precise panning of select sounds such as a helicopter or rain.

Consumer implementations

Home theater 
At the end of June 2014, Dolby Labs' hardware partners announced that Dolby Atmos would soon be coming to home theaters. Dolby Atmos enabled movies are available with Kaleidescape's movie players. A first public demo was performed at CEDIA Expo 2014 on a Trinnov Audio Altitude 32 processor.

Manufacturers such as Denon, Marantz, Onkyo, Pioneer, and Yamaha announced products that brought Dolby Atmos into home theaters. Products offered range from premium home cinema receivers and preamplifiers to mid-range home-theater-in-a-box (HTiB) packages. On June 4, 2018, Apple announced that tvOS 12 for AppleTV 4K would support Dolby Atmos when released in Fall 2018.

You can turn your home theater into Atmos enabled one by adding more speakers to your 5.1 or 7.1 setup. For doing so, you may either install at least two ceiling speakers, or place at least two up-firing Dolby Atmos enabled speakers atop your front/rear speakers. Nowadays there is an option to buy an Atmos enabled soundbar.

Despite being placed just a bit higher than ear-level, Dolby Atmos enabled speakers can reproduce overhead sound with the help of up-firing elements. They send sound waves into the ceiling, which reflects the waves down towards the listener. It contributes to the immersion of a listener into believing the reality of what is happening.

There are two types of Dolby Atmos enabled speakers:

 Integrated speakers are traditional front-firing speakers combined with Dolby Atmos enabled up-firing speakers in one speaker cabinet.
 Add-on modules are Dolby Atmos enabled up-firing speakers placed into their own cabinet so that you simply add them on top or within  of your current speakers.

You can also mix overhead speakers with Dolby Atmos enabled ones. However, adding any new speakers (except for subwoofer and the central ones) must go in pairs to guarantee a balanced soundstage.

Implementation and differences from commercial implementations 
The first movie to be released on Blu-ray with Dolby Atmos was Transformers: Age of Extinction. The first video game to use Dolby Atmos was Star Wars: Battlefront with a special agreement between EA and Dolby Laboratories. This game uses HDMI bit streaming from the PC to deliver Atmos audio to consumer Audio-Visual Receivers. Overwatch and Battlefield 1 for PC also have Atmos audio. On the Xbox One, Crackdown 3 and Gears of War 4 support Atmos.

Dolby Atmos for Music, an audio-only iteration of the format was adopted by streaming music services Tidal (uses E-AC3) and Amazon Music in December 2019.

Sennheiser launched a new soundbar with built-in Dolby Atmos technology named AMBEO soundbar at the 2019 CES in Las Vegas. The soundbar utilizes analysis of a room's reflective characteristics to enable a single-unit 5.1.4 setup.

On May 17, 2021, Apple Music announced the addition of spatial audio with support for Dolby Atmos and lossless audio. The feature started rolling out to Apple Music users using Apple devices on June 7, 2021. Dolby Atmos is now fully supported on Android with Windows support coming in the future.

Streaming services like Netflix, Disney+, Vudu, Apple TV+, Amazon Prime Video and HBO Max (only available for movies) used Dolby Atmos.

Because of limited bandwidth and lack of processing power, Atmos in home theaters is different from cinemas. A spatially-coded sub-stream is added to Dolby TrueHD or Dolby Digital Plus or is present as metadata in Dolby MAT 2.0, LPCM like format. This sub-stream is an efficient representation of the full, original object-based mix. This is not a matrix-encoded channel, but a spatially-encoded digital signal with panning metadata. Atmos in home theaters can support 24.1.10 channels and uses the spatially-encoded object audio sub-stream to mix the audio presentation to match the installed speaker configuration. There are programs from Dolby that handle 128 objects (including 118 dynamic object and 10 beds) for macOS and Windows.

In order to reduce the bit-rate, nearby objects and speakers are clustered together to form aggregate objects, which are then dynamically panned in the process that Dolby calls spatial coding. The sound of the original objects may be spread over multiple aggregate objects to maintain the power and position of the original objects. The spatial resolution (and hence the strength of the clustering) can be controlled by the filmmakers when they use the Dolby Atmos Production Suite tools. Dolby Digital Plus has also been updated with Atmos extensions.

Headphones
Dolby Atmos also has headphone implementations for PCs, the Xbox One, the Xbox Series X/S, and mobile phones. They work by using audio processing algorithms to convert the Atmos object metadata into a binaural 360° output using the usual two headphone speakers. This technique is an improvement on the previous Dolby Headphone technology, allowing infinite channels of sound to be processed into a virtual surround experience.

Windows 10 Version 1703 Creators Update added platform-level support for spatial sound processing including both Windows Sonic for Headphones and Dolby Atmos for Headphones. Dolby Atmos for headphones requires a license to function which can be purchased or redeemed inside the Dolby Access app. Some branded headphones designed explicitly to deliver better audio quality exist, but users can use their normal headphones or earphones so long as the decoding device uses Atmos, or the audio track itself has been previously downmixed.

With the release of third-generation AirPods in October 2021, Apple added support for Dolby Atmos, branded Spatial Audio, to all AirPods (including earlier hardware generations), AirPods Pro, AirPods Max, and most headphones marketed under the Beats brand.

Smartphones
Dolby Atmos has smartphone implementations for devices including but not limited to the iPhone XS/XR and later (when running iOS 13 or later) and almost all Samsung smartphones and tablets released after the Samsung Galaxy S9. Other smartphones and tablets with Dolby Atmos include the Razer Phone and Razer Phone 2, the ZTE Axon 7, Sony Xperia 1, Lenovo K4 Note, Lenovo Vibe K5 Note, Lenovo K8 Note, Huawei P20, Huawei P30, Poco F3, Realme XT, Realme X2 Pro, Realme 6 Pro, Realme X7 Max, Realme Pad, Nokia 6, OnePlus 7, OnePlus 7T, OnePlus 8 and OnePlus 8T, Moto g82. Implementations in phone use both the binaural headphone technology and the dual loudspeaker virtual surround sound implementation similar to that used in Dolby Atmos TVs and Soundbars.

Automobiles
Dolby's first implementation of Atmos in an automobile will be the Lucid Air sedan from Lucid Motors.

Compatibility 
Dolby Atmos is adaptable and can be played back on various speaker setups. As well, many audio products provide additional support for Dolby Atmos.

The technology has been licensed to other brands by Dolby. Since its launch, the Dolby Atmos format has been used by / affiliated with several companies in consumer technology as well as major film productions. This has added to the overall availability of content for Dolby Atmos’ users.

See also
 A3D, a similar, HRTF-based 3D surround system
 Ambisonics, a similar spatial sound encoding technique. Nowadays used for some games and VR Audio
 Auro-3D, a similar, completely channel-based 3D surround system
 DTS:X, a competing fully object-based system
 MPEG-H 3D Audio
 Sound Blaster X-Fi, a competing surround sound "audio holography" system for headphones tuned to ear shape.
 EAX, Creative, real-time multi-object spatial audio rendering implementation

References

External links
 
 ARK Dolby Atmos webpage

Audiovisual introductions in 2012
Dolby Laboratories
Film sound production
Surround sound
Ultra-high-definition television